Yeh Dil Mannge More is an Indian Hindi-language romance drama television series produced by Ekta Kapoor and Shobha Kapoor under Balaji Telefilms. The series stars Akshay Mhatre and Twinkle Patel as protagonists. It premiered on 15 August 2022 on DD National. It went off air in November 2022.

Plot
The series revolves around an Army officer and a doctor. The series explores how tied under their profession they fight each other, ultimately falling in love.

Cast 
 Akshay Mhatre as Major Aryan Singh
 Twinkle Patel as Dr. Jyoti
 Sejal Jaiswal as Sandhya

See also 
 List of programs broadcast by DD National

References

External links
 

Balaji Telefilms television series
2022 Indian television series debuts
2020s Indian television series
Indian drama television series
Hindi-language television shows
DD National original programming